The Houston Open Darts Tournament was an annual darts tournament for steel-point darts in Houston, Texas. The combined prize money is in excess of $10,000. In 2013 the tournament took place on 21-23 June. This year was tournament played for the last time. Due to organizational problems within the hosting body, Harris County Darts Association, the tournament was not held in 2014.

The Houston Open Darts Tournament has been held annually, every year since 1978. The first year, 1978, was held in the ballroom of the Dunfey's Hotel, near Sharpstown Mall  in Houston, Texas.  Since then, it has been held at several different major hotels. 

The Houston Open consists of many events, currently 13, played over three day weekend: Friday through Sunday. Events include singles, doubles, and mixed events for 501 and Cricket.  ADO national ranking points are awarded to the winner of the 501 Singles event.

References

1978 establishments in Texas
2013 disestablishments in Texas
2021 establishments in Texas 
Darts tournaments